Robinsonia mera is a moth in the family Erebidae. It was described by William Schaus in 1910. It is found in Costa Rica.

References

Moths described in 1910
Robinsonia (moth)
Arctiinae of South America